Patsy Pease is an American actress. She is most known for her role as Kimberly Brady on the soap opera Days of Our Lives.

Early life
Pease was born in Charlotte, North Carolina. She attended the North Carolina School of the Arts four year bachelor's program in theater arts. She was awarded the governor's scholarship for her junior and senior years. She is an accredited teacher for the American Film Institute and S.A.G. Conservatory, dance teacher and fitness consultant.

Career
Pease's first soap opera role was as waitress Cissie Mitchell Sentell on the soap opera Search for Tomorrow, a role she played from 1978 until 1980.

In 1984, Pease debuted as Kimberly Brady on the NBC daytime soap opera Days of Our Lives. Her character was part of a popular supercouple in her love affair and eventual marriage to Shane Donovan (played by Charles Shaughnessy). Pease was on contract with Days Of Our Lives until 1992. In 1990 she took maternity leave, returning from late 1991 to December 1992 after her child was born. Pease has reprised the role in guest appearances multiple times since.

In 1986, Pease won "Best Actress" in the Soap Opera Digest Awards, as well as the "Best Super Couple" award with Charles Shaughnessy. She was nominated again for "Best Actress" in 1988, instead winning "Best Super Couple" again the same year. 

In 2015, Pease joined the cast of the soap opera web series The Bay in the role of Lola Baker. In 2016, she was nominated for an Indie Series Award for Best Guest Actress in a Drama, and a Daytime Emmy Award for Outstanding Actress in a Digital Daytime Drama Series for the role.

Personal life

Pease attended the North Carolina Governor's School of Drama in 1973.  Later she was accepted into the North Carolina School of the Arts BFA program in the theater arts.  Working her way through her freshman year, she was mentored by Broadway jazz dancer Mollie Murray and taught summer classes.  She also performed as a jazz dancer for NCSA.  She won the Governor's Scholarship for outstanding performance in both her junior and senior years.  She played "a mean 12 bar blues" piano at a Winston-Salem supper club during the summer vacation to pay for her one-way bus ticket to New York City after graduation. 

Pease checked hats and coats at the Copacabana in New York, waited tables, cleaned apartments and lived on a five floor walk up, sharing one bathroom with 20 girls at the famous Rehearsal Club.  She landed the role of the country and western Cissie Mitchell for Search For Tomorrow in 1978.  But dance was in her blood so she left a contract role after two years, to the shock of the producers and her agent, to "shadow" Bob Fosse's entourage and "gypsy" New York's finest jazz and ballet classes until she left with her boyfriend for Los Angeles in 1981. 

In Los Angeles, Pease's agency dropped her, her boyfriend left and her car was stolen.  So she went to the nearest Big Five and bought the best tennis shoe available and, "New York style", just walked until she found work.  She worked for fitness teacher Karen Voight.  Pease did not own a TV, slept on a futon and struggled to pay the rent for a one-room walk up in the downtown Wilshire area.  She studied Tae Kwon Do with master Jun Chong to keep her spirits up and survive the neighborhood.  Then she had a phone call from casting for Days Of Our Lives.  She was not listed so, to this day, she has no idea how they found her. She was asked to audition the next day. Without a car, Pease had to thumb a ride to get to the Sunset Gower Studios. When she arrived her clothes were soaked with sweat, so makeup dept  dried off Pease's clothes with a hair dryer.  She had four "call back" auditions over the next few days.  She waited until everyone left so they would not see her waiting for a bus to go home. 

Pease has two sons.  One was born with a rare disease, arthrogryposis.  She knew she belonged caring for both her children instead of having someone else raise them. So she left show business until after her son had 12 surgeries and recovered fully. Pease went on to do six films and recurring parts for The Young and the Restless. She also worked on Days of our Lives when needed. 

When Pease returned to Days, in 1991, she went public with her own story; her mother was schizophrenic and abused her and her two siblings for years.

Currently, Pease speaks with support groups.

Television and film roles
 1978–84: Search for Tomorrow as Cissie Mitchell Sentell
 1980: He Knows You're Alone as Joyce
 1983: Trapper John, M.D. as Anita (1 episode)
 1983: Remington Steele as Sherry Webster (1 episode)
 1983: Space Raiders as Amanda
 1984–92, 1994, 1996–98, 2002–04, 2008, 2010, 2013–16: Days of Our Lives as Kimberly Brady (Contract: 1984–92,  Guest returns: 1994, 1996–98, 2002–04, 2008, 2010, 2013–16)
 1992: Silk Stalkings as Jackie Stonewell (1 episode)
 1994: Hardball as Gloria (1 episode)
 1995: Improper Conduct as Jo Ann
 1997: Total Reality as Leader
 1996: The Young and the Restless as Patricia Fennell
 1999: Two Shades of Blue as Gwen Reynolds
 2003: Drop Dead Gorgeous as Mrs. Barris
 2015: The Bay as Lola Baker

References

External links
 

Actresses from Charlotte, North Carolina
Actresses from North Carolina
American film actresses
American soap opera actresses
American television actresses
Living people
21st-century American women
Year of birth missing (living people)